The bulbourethral glands or Cowper's  glands (named for English anatomist William Cowper) are two small exocrine glands in the reproductive system of many male mammals (of all domesticated animals, they are absent only in dogs). They are homologous to Bartholin's glands in females. The bulbourethral glands are responsible for producing a pre-ejaculate fluid called Cowper's fluid (known colloquially as pre-ejaculate or pre-cum), which is secreted during sexual arousal, neutralizing the acidity of the urethra in preparation for the passage of sperm cells.

Location
Bulbourethral glands are located posterior and lateral to the membranous portion of the urethra at the base of the penis, between the two layers of the fascia of the urogenital diaphragm, in the deep perineal pouch. They are enclosed by transverse fibers of the sphincter urethrae membranaceae muscle.

Structure

The bulbourethral glands are compound tubulo-alveolar glands, each approximately the size of a pea in humans. In chimpanzees, they are not visible during dissection, but can be found on microscopic examination. In boars, they are up to 18 cm long and 5 cm in diameter. They are composed of several lobules held together by a fibrous covering. Each lobule consists of a number of acini, lined by columnar epithelial cells, opening into a duct that joins with the ducts of other lobules to form a single excretory duct. This duct is approximately 2.5 cm long and opens into the bulbar urethra at the base of the penis. The glands gradually diminish in size with advancing age.

Function

The bulbourethral gland contributes up to 4 ml of fluid during sexual arousal. The secretion is a clear fluid rich in mucoproteins that help to lubricate the distal urethra and neutralize acidic urine which remains in the urethra.

According to one preliminary study, the bulbourethral gland fluid might not contain any sperm, whereas another study showed some men did leak sperm in potentially significant quantities (in a range from low counts up to 50 million sperm per ml) into the pre-ejaculatory fluid, potentially leading to conception from the introduction of pre-ejaculate. However, the sperm source is a residual or pre-ejaculatory leak from the testicles into the vas deferens, rather than from the bulbourethral gland itself.

Gallery

See also
 List of homologues of the human reproductive system
 Urethral gland

References

Exocrine system
Glands
Mammal male reproductive system